The Battle of Kempen was a battle during the Thirty Years' War in Kempen, Westphalia on 17 January 1642. It resulted in the victory of a French-Weimar-Hessian army under the French Comte de Guébriant and the Hessian Generalleutnant Kaspar Graf von Eberstein against the Imperial Army under General Guillaume de Lamboy, who was captured.

Background
Guébriant's Franco-Weimarian Army of Germany consisted of 2,000 infantry in 12 regiments and 3,500 cavalry in another 12 regiments. It joined up with Eberstein's Hessian army of 4,000 men, split in equal halves of infantry and cavalry, in December 1641 near the Rhine. The Allies crossed the Rhine at Wesel and began to ravage the vicinity of Cologne. Lamboy, whose Imperial force of 9,000 men and 6 guns had been assisting the Spanish in the Low Countries, crossed the Meuse as Imperial Field Marshal Melchior Graf von Hatzfeldt marched from winter quarters in Würzburg with 7,000 reinforcements. Guébriant resolved to attack Lamboy before Hatzfeldt could arrive. The Allies were also running out of food. A third of Lamboy's men were combat ineffective due to sickness or lack of weapons. Overconfident, he ignored his instructions to wait for Hatzfeldt and set up a strong position behind a double ditch near Hüls.

Battle
Lamboy was eating his breakfast when Guébriant's army attacked across the ditch. Guébriant pinned down his front with infantry and then carried out a pincer movement with cavalry, dragoons and musketeers, destroying the Imperial force in a Cannae-style battle of annihilation. Lamboy was captured along with 19 colonels, 120 flags, 4,000–5,000 men as well as all the artillery pieces and baggage. Another 2,000–2,500 were killed The 2,000 survivors linked up with Hatzfeldt in the plain of Wetterau.

Aftermath
The massacred wreck of Lamboy's army made it impossible for the Spanish and Imperials to create a force in the Rhineland that could threaten the position of the French and their Hessian allies. Guébriant moved his army into the Electorate of Cologne, tying down the attention of both the Spanish Army of Flanders and the Imperial/Bavarian forces in southern Germany. Over the next 9 months, the French captured Kempen, Neuss and Düren as well as several other places. Hungry Spanish and Imperial soldiers deserted over to the French side, who now had plenty of food. Guébriant coordinated his actions with the Dutch commander Prince Frederick Henry and prevented the Habsburgs from exploiting their victory at Honnecourt in May. Guébriant's skillful generalship was recognized at the French court and he was rewarded with a promotion to Marshal after the battle. 3,600 French reinforcements arrived by sea by way of Rotterdam and the Dutch sent another 3,000 men. The downside to all these achievements was the maintenance of Guébriant's force as an army-in-being to distract the Habsburgs, which tied it down in the Rhineland and prevented it from undertaking further offensive operations.

Hatzfeldt was reinforced with thousands of troops by the Empire, which spent hundreds of thousands of thalers to raise a new army. By August Hatzfeldt, joined by the famous Johann von Werth, had 15,000 men under his command facing the French but even such expenditure was not enough for him to seek battle as he still lacked sufficient numbers of horses and was dependent on the Spanish for food due to the very high prices charged by the local traders. Guébriant and Eberstein argued over possession of the captured towns, which the French wanted to keep under their control. At the end of September the French handed over their conquests to Hesse-Kassel in exchange for 1,000 Hessian troops, while the rest of the Hessian army returned home. Guébriant then marched east in a failed attempt to prevent the Principality of Brunswick-Wolfenbüttel from signing a peace treaty with the Emperor. Guébriant moved his army to Westphalia in response to appeals from Lennart Torstensson, the commander-in-chief of the Swedish army in Germany, to cover the Swedish flank from Habsburg forces. On 2 November, Torstensson inflicted a crushing defeat on the Imperials at Breitenfeld, capturing Leipzig in the aftermath and putting Saxony under Swedish control. The season was too late for Guébriant to take advantage of the shift in the strategic situation.

References

Citations

Bibliography

 
 
 
 
 
 
 

Conflicts in 1642
Kempen
Battles in North Rhine-Westphalia